Shwe Maung (also spelt Shwe Mg, aka Abdul Razak; born 30 June 1965) is a Rohingya rights activist in Myanmar and politician who served as a member of parliament in the House of Representatives for Buthidaung constituency from 2011 to 2016.

Early life and family
Shwe Maung was born in Buthidaung, Rakhine State to Rohingya Muslim parents, Abdul Hadi and Aye Sein. Although his parents are Myanmar citizens, the Union Election Commission of Myanmar ruled that they were not in order to bar U Shwe Maung from the 2015 General Election.

Political career
U Shwe Maung is a former member of the Union Solidarity and Development Party. He served political development since 2010, Rohingya rights and prospects for reconciliation in Rakhine State.

In the 2010 Myanmar general election, he contested the Buthidaung Township constituency and won a House of Representatives seat, the country's lower house. He is a one of Rohingya member in the Myanmar's parliament.

During his time in parliament, he was a member of the Reform and Modernization Assessment Committee. He was deemed ineligible to run for re-election due to supposed issues of citizenship, Myanmar's parliament barred from contesting 2015 Myanmar general election.

Shwe Maung currently serves as a board member of the ASEAN Parliamentarians for Human Rights (APHR) and founding member of the International Panel of Parliamentarians for Freedom of Religion or Belief (IPPFoRB), also serving President of Arakan Institute for Peace and Development (AiPAD).

On 8 September 2017, police captain of Buthidaung Police Station opened a case against Shwe Maung under the Counter-Terrorism Law for allegedly supporting the Arakan Rohingya Salvation Army (ARSA) and defending them via his Facebook page. U Shwe Maung requested State Counsellor Aung San Suu Kyi and Myanmar Military Chief Senior General Min Aung Hlaing via his Facebook Page to protect innocent Rohingya people from his constituency from being killed by Myanmar Security Forces.

References

External links 
Pyithu Hluttaw Parliament : Shwe Maung's MP Profile
ASEAN Parliamentarians for Human Rights Board Members

Rohingya politicians
Union Solidarity and Development Party politicians
Members of Pyithu Hluttaw
1965 births
Living people
People from Rakhine State